Merry Hill is a suburb of Wolverhampton, West Midlands and a ward of Wolverhampton City Council.  It is situated in the south-west of the city, bordering South Staffordshire and the Tettenhall Wightwick, Park, Graiseley and Penn wards. It forms part of the Wolverhampton South West constituency.

Merry Hill is itself is the main focal point of the ward, situated at the junction of five main roads. Because of the layout of the ward boundaries, parts of the suburbs of Bradmore, Castlecroft and Finchfield are covered by Merry Hill ward. The population of the ward taken at the 2011 census was 12,189.

Highfields Secondary school, Uplands Junior school, St Michael's RC Primary school and Springdale Primary school are all situated within the ward.

Merry Hill is served by National Express West Midlands service 4 which operates daily between Spring Hill and the i54 via the city centre.

History 
Merry Hill once had a large house with surrounding gardens and an orchard which was named Bellencroft. The house has been demolished for a long while and the gardens no longer exist, instead a street named Bellencroft Gardens is in their location. Where the house once existed are now 2-3 private homes. The orchard of Bellencroft is now a cul-de-sac named Orchard Crescent which leads to Orchard Court. All that remains of Bellencroft is the pillar from the entrance to the driveway and until recently had the original 'Bellencroft' text on one of them. The text began to peel off and has been replaced with a modern plaque also saying 'Bellencroft'.

The house was originally named 'Bhylls House', also being located on the street named 'Bhylls Lane'. The name was changed by the owner to incorporate his daughters' names, 'Bella' and 'Ellen'.

Three multi-storey blocks of flats were erected at Merry Hill, on the edge of the Highfields estate, in 1967. They have dominated the local scene ever since.

There is also a Public house called the Merry Hill.

References

External links 
Area Forum

Areas of Wolverhampton
Wards of Wolverhampton City Council